Scaptesyle equidistans is a moth in the subfamily Arctiinae. It was described by Thomas Pennington Lucas in 1890. It is found in Australia, where it has been recorded from Queensland and New South Wales.

References

Moths described in 1890
Lithosiini